Faig Ahmed (born 1982 in Sumqayit, Azerbaijan) is an Azerbaijani contemporary visual artist who is best known for his surrealist weavings which integrate visual distortions into traditional oriental rugs.

Ahmed graduated from the sculpture program at the Azerbaijan State Academy of Fine Arts in Baku in 2004. In 2007, Ahmed's work was included in the Azerbaijan's first pavilion in the Venice Biennalle in 2013 he participated in the show “Love Me, Love Me Not” and the 11th Mercosul Visual Arts Biennial in 2018.

While Ahmed has created artworks in multiple media, including sculpture, video, and installation, he is best known for his surrealist sculptural textiles, which apply optical illusions in the form of often psychedelic visual manipulations (including warping, glitching, melting, pixelating, and unraveling) to traditional Islamic rugs. The textiles are manufactured by a group of skilled weavers who follow Ahmed's designs paying strict attention to traditional Azerbaijani weaving techniques.

Exhibitions 

Ahmed has exhibited his works worldwide including group and solo exhibitions in New York, Paris, London, Berlin, Moscow, Dubai, Sharjah, Mumbai, Rome, Venice, Washington D.C., Hong Kong, Mumbai, Moscow, Azerbaijan, Sweden, Norway, Honolulu, Melbourne, and Sydney.

In the past few years, Ahmed’s works have been exhibited in several museums including the Museum of Fine Art Boston, Los Angeles County Museum, Bellevue Art Museum, Milwaukee Institute of Art & Design, MOCA Cleveland, Museum of Old and New Art, Tasmania, the Museum of Contemporary Art of Rome (MACRO), Pennsylvania College of Art and Design, Shangri La Museum of Islamic Art, NYU Abu Dhabi, the Textile Museum of Sweden, the Projective Eye Gallery at UNC Charlotte, New Tretyakov Gallery, Istanbul Modern and others.

Additionally in 2013, he was nominated for the Jameel Prize 3 at the Victoria and Albert Museum in London.

Collections 
Ahmed's rug sculptures are held in notable public collections, including the Los Angeles County Museum of Art, Seattle Art Museum, RISD Museum, Art Institute of Chicago, Seattle Art Museum, Palm Springs Museum of Art, Chrysler Museum of Art, Currier Museum of Art, Rhode Island School of Design Museum (RISD), Wake Forest University Museum; Bargoin Museum, France; MOCAK Museum of Contemporary Art, Poland; The National Gallery of Victoria, Australia; Arsenal art contemporain Montréal, Canada; The National Museum of Art, Architecture and Design, Norway.

His works has also been placed in private collections such as the West Collection, Philadelphia; the collection of Beth Rudin DeWoody, New York City; Galila Barzilaï-Hollander’s collection, Brussels, Espacio SOLO, Puerta de Alcalá, Madrid; and the private collection of Sheikh Zayed bin Sultan bin Khalifa al-Nahyan, United Arab Emirates among others.

Selected exhibitions 
Solo exhibitions

2022

 Faig Ahmed: Collision. San Luis Obispo Museum of Art. San Luis Obispo, California, USA

2021

 “Faig Ahmed: Pir” Sapar Contemporary gallery. New York, USA

2020

 "Faig Ahmed: Dissolving Order" Aga Khan Museum. Toronto, Canada

2019

 ”Faig Ahmed” Honolulu Museum of Art.  Honolulu, Hawaii, USA
 “Faig Ahmed” Shangri La Museum of Islamic Art, Culture & Design, Honolulu, Hawaii, USA

2018

 “ Faig Ahmed: Nonvisual Language”  The George Washington University Museum.
 The Textile Museum. Washington, USA

2017

 “ Faig Ahmed “ Pennsylvania College of Art & Design, Lancaster, USA
 “ Equation “ Textile Museum of Sweden, Borås, Sweden
 “10−35” Kapellhaus Baku, Azerbaijan

2016

 “ Source Code ” Sapar Contemporary,  New York, USA
 “ Ne var, odur ”  YARAT Contemporary Art Space, Baku, Azerbaijan
 “Black Sheep ” NYU Abu Dhabi, New York, USA
 “ Points of Perception ” MACRO Testaccio, Rome, Italy

2015

 ” Omnia Mutantur, Nihil Interit ” Montoro12 Contemporary Art. Rome, Italy

2014

 “ Fluid forms ”, Cuadro Gallery. Dubai, UAE

2013

 “ East in Twist ”, Leila Heller Gallery, New York, USA

2012

 “ Actual Tradition ”, Kicik Qalart Gallery, Baku, Azerbaijan

Group exhibitions

2022

 “Silk”, GAD - Giudecca Art District. Venice, Italy
 “Core Memory: Encoded”, Newcomb Art Museum of Tulane.  New Orleans, LA, USA
 “The Playground”, House of Art Georges & Claude Pompidou. Contemporary Art Center. Cajarc, France

2021

 “The Silk Web”, The Dowse Art Museum. Lower Hutt, New Zealand
 “As Precious as Gold, Carpets from the Islamic World”, Currier Museum of Art. Manchester, USA
 EXPO 2020, Azerbaijan Pavilion. Dubai, UAE
 Art Stays Festival of Contemporary Art. Ptuj, Slovenia

2020

 “A Collection in the Making. Art – Architecture – Design”. The National Museum of Art, Architecture and Design. Oslo, Norway
 “ Guests: Artists and Craftspeople ”. Istanbul Modern. Istanbul, Turkey
 “ The Russian Fairy Tale. From Vasnetsov to the Present “. New Tretyakov Gallery.  Moscow Russia
 “ Still Human”.  Colección SOLO. Madrid, Spain
 “Future Artifacts”  Projective Eye Gallery at UNC Charlotte Center City. The University of North Carolina, Charlotte, USA

2019

 “Off the Velvet Chest” Triumph gallery.  Moscow, Russia
 “Le conseguenze dell’errore” TRA Treviso Ricerca Arte. Treviso, Italy
 “Tommy Cash and Rick Owens. The Pure and the Damned” Kumu Art Museum. Tallinn, Estonia
 "Hannah Ryggen Triennial 2019: New land" Nordenfjeldske Kunstindustrimuseum (National Museum of Decorative Arts) Trondheim, Norway
 “Tradition Interrupted” Bedford Gallery at the Lesher Center for the Arts. Walnut Creek, California, USA
 “Derived from the Decorative: Works by Faig Ahmed, Beth Lipman and Bouke de Vries”
 Cheekwood Estate and Gardens. Nashville, Tennessee, USA

2018

 “The Shapes of Birds: Contemporary Art of the Middle East and North Africa”.  Newport Art Museum, Newport, Rhode Island, USA
 “Faig Ahmed” Church Fine Arts, Sheppard Contemporary. Reno, Nevada, USA
 “ The Phantom of Liberty: Contemporary Works in the RISD Museum Collection”. RISD Museum, Rhode Island, USA
 “ .OBJ ”, National Design & Craft Gallery. Castle Yard, Kilkenny, Ireland
 “ Nomadic Murals: Contemporary Tapestries and Carpets”.  Boca Raton Museum of Art, Boca Raton, USA
 “ Tissage Tressage quand la sculpture defile”. Villa Datris Foundation, Paris, France
 “ The Atlantic Triangle” , the 11th Mercosul Visual Arts Biennial. Porto Alegre, Brazil
 “ Long, Winding Journeys: Contemporary Art and The Islamic Tradition” Katonah Museum of Art, Katonah, USA

2017

 NGV Triennial, National Gallery of Victoria. Melbourne, Australia.
 4th Ural Industrial Biennial of Contemporary Art. Russia
 " Contemporary Art in Carpets and Flying Carpet" Azerbaijan Carpet Museum, Azerbaijan, Baku
 OSTRALE – Biennale. 11th International Exhibition of Contemporary Art, Dresden, Germany

2016

 “ On the origin of art ” MONA - Museum of Old and New Art, Hobart Tasmania Australia
 “ Out of Hand ”, Museum of Applied Arts & Sciences, Powerhouse Museum, Ultimo, Sydney, Australia
 " Wall to Wall. Carpets by Artists ", Museum of Contemporary Art, Cleveland, USA
 “ FITE 2016 – REBELS ” Musée Bargoin,  Clermont-Ferrand, France
 “Atoms and Bytes: Redefining Craft in the Digital Age” Bellevue Arts Museum, Bellevue, WA, USA
 “ Repetition- Reticulation ” Milwaukee Institute of Art & Design, Milwaukee, USA
 “Islamic Art Now, Part 2. Contemporary Art of the Middle East” The Los Angeles County Museum of Art. Los Angeles, USA

2015

 "Crafted: Object in Flux" Museum of Fine Arts Boston. Boston, USA
 “Exploring Inward”. Louise Blouin Foundation. London, UK

2014

 “Threads”, Museum voor Moderne Kunst Arnhem. Holland, Arnhem At the Crossroads 2, Sotheby’s auction house’, London, UK

2013

 Venice Biennale 2013, “Love me Love me Not”, Yarat Contemporary Art Space Pavilion, Venice, Italy
 “Jameel Prize” 3 shortlist nomination Victoria & Albert Museum. London, UK

2012

 “Fly to Baku. Contemporary art from Azerbaijan”, Phillips de Pury & Company, London, UK

2011

 “On Soz”, Yarat Contemporary art space, Baku
 “Fabulous Four”, Kicik Qalart Gallery, Baku

2008

 “Steps of time”, Kunsthalle im Lipsiusbau, Dresden, Germany

2007

 “Aluminum 3”, International Biennial of Contemporary Art, Baku Azerbaijan
 52nd Venice Biennale, Azerbaijan pavilion, Venice, Italy

2006

 “Caucasus”, National Center for Contemporary Art, Moscow, Russia

Curatorial projects 
2013

 Zavod, Baku Air Condition Plant building. Baku, Azerbaijan
 Exhibition "World is yours, World is mine". Baku, Azerbaijan

2017

 ARTIM LAB: 24HRS PROJECT-EXHIBITION ZERO. Baku, Azerbaijan

References

External links
 Artist's website

Living people
1982 births
Azerbaijani artists
Contemporary artists
21st-century Azerbaijani artists
People from Sumgait